Percy Elmer Mitton (May 10, 1911 – 1991) was a Canadian politician. He served in the Legislative Assembly of New Brunswick from 1960 to 1970 as member of the Liberal party.

References

1911 births
1991 deaths